The Office of the Chief Archivist of Lithuania is a government agency, which participates in the shaping of national policy in the field of management and use of documents and archives, as well as implements this policy, supports the Chief Archivist of Lithuania in the carrying-out of state administration of the field of documents and archives.

History 
The emergence of archives in Lithuania is associated with the formation of the Lithuanian state in the first half of the 13th century. The old Lithuanian chancery archives of Grand Duke and King Mindaugas did not survive: they were destroyed by numerous wars and fires. The Grand Duke's chancery archives later acquired the title of the Lithuanian Metrica. In the Middle Ages archives of towns, churches and estates were formed. When the Russian Empire occupied Lithuania in 1795, the most important Lithuanian archives were transferred to Russia.

It was in middle of the 19th century the first archives was established as a special institution for accumulating and preserving records. The year 1852 saw the establishment of the Vilnius Central Archives of Early Register Books, the purpose of which was to preserve official files of the Grand Duchy of Lithuania. Records from the period of the Russian invasion (19th–20th centuries), belonging to Tsarist Russian institutions of the Vilnius Gubernya, were stored in the Joint Archives of Vilnius Institutions established in 1872–76.

After the declaration of the independent Republic of Lithuania, the Central State Archives were established in Kaunas on 19 October 1921. The purpose of these archives was to collect and preserve all records of former state and local government institutions, take care of archives belonging to private persons, and accommodate archival records recovered from Russia.

The occupation of Lithuanian in June 1940 marked the beginning of the destruction of the country's political system and self-dependence as well as an all-out sovietization of the archives and enforcement of the Soviet archival system. On August 5, 1940 the Council of Ministers of Lithuanian SSR, following suit of other Soviet republics, laid the responsibility for archives management and preservation with the ministry of the Interior. In 1961 the Archival Board under the Council of Ministers of the LSSR was established. In 1957–68, the basis was laid to the network of state archives consisting of central and regional archives. It should be mentioned that during those years (1940–90) Lithuanian archives made some notable progress as well, namely the recovery of a number of archival records from other countries, and the development of a sound state archival system.

After the Lithuanian independence was reestablished on 11 March 1990, the modern system of state archives was formed.

At present, the state archival system comprises the central institution (Office of the Chief Archivist of Lithuania), and 15 state archives subordinate to the Office of the Chief Archivist of Lithuania, including 5 specialised archives (Lithuanian State Historical Archives, Lithuanian Central State Archives, Lithuanian Special Archives, Lithuanian State Modern Archives, Lithuanian Archives of Literature and Art) and 10 county archives (Alytus, Kaunas, Klaipėda, Marijampolė, Panevėžys, Šiauliai, Tauragė, Telšiai, Utena and Vilnius).

The National Documentary Fonds consists of activity documents of state and municipal institutions, agencies and enterprises, persons authorised by the state, activity documents of state agencies and enterprises which operated in Lithuania at various times, as well as the documents preserved in state archives. Activity documents of enduring value of non-governmental organisations, private legal and natural persons, as well as the documents of the historical heritage of Lithuania or related to Lithuania, or their copies, received from other states may be included to the National Documentary Fonds.

Today, state archives play an important role in the processes of preserving and using public records of the Lithuanian National Documentary Fonds, making them accessible to the citizens and governmental and public institutions, creating efficient information search systems, providing public services.

The state archives service plays an important role in the processes of records management in the public sector, for the transparency and accountability of public administration. State archives provide records on approximately 2,000 institutions and agencies.

Functions 
Today the functions of the Office of the Chief Archivist of Lithuania are defined in Law of archives of Republic of Lithuania.

Its main functions are to:
 ensure enforcement in Lithuania of legal acts in the field of management and use of European Union documents;
 present co-ordination findings with respect to draft legal acts, other documents related to the policy of management of archives and documents and drawn up by other state institutions and agencies;
 form a uniform practice of documents management in state and municipal institutions, agencies and enterprises;
 solve issues concerning the transfer of activity documents of state and municipal institutions, agencies and enterprises;  
 issue licences to provide the documents arrangement and (or) storage services in accordance with the procedure laid down by legal acts;
 issue permissions to export documents from the Republic of Lithuania in accordance with the procedure laid down by legal acts;
 within the limits of its competence prepare the position of the Republic of Lithuania concerning matters discussed at the institutions and their work bodies of the European Union, also participate, when positions are prepared by other state institutions and agencies; 
 within the limits of its competence transfer into national law and implement the European Union law (acquis communautaire), fulfil other obligations related to membership in the European Union and provide related information to the European Union institutions in accordance with the procedure laid down by the European Union legal acts;
 within the limits of its competence represent the interests of the Republic of Lithuania at the institutions and their work bodies of the European Union;
 within the limits of its competence maintain communication and collaborate with respective institutions and international organisations of foreign countries, participate in the creation of draft international agreements, implement international projects;
 prepare indexes of retention periods of internal administration documents of state and municipal institutions, agencies and enterprises, activity documents of non-governmental organisations and private legal persons, the creation of which is established by regulations, prepare and co-ordinate with interested central entities of state administration indexes of retention periods of documents accumulated in the sphere assigned to such entities;
 prepare draft legal acts in compliance with the requirements established by legal acts and participate in the preparation of draft legal acts related to state administration in the field of management of documents and archives;
 consider applications and complaints of natural and legal persons;
 submit the information to state and municipal institutions, agencies and enterprises, private legal and natural persons concerning the competence of the Office of the Chief Archivist of Lithuania.

See also
History of archives of Lithuania

References

External links 
 

Government agencies of Lithuania
Lithuania
Archives in Lithuania